The 1991 Indian general election polls in Tamil Nadu were held for 39 seats in the state. The result was a repeat landslide victory for Indian National Congress, and its ally All India Anna Dravida Munnetra Kazhagam, winning all 39 seats. The opposition party Dravida Munnetra Kazhagam, which was part of the National Front, lost heavily, not winning a single seat. During this election, Rajiv Gandhi was assassinated, when campaigning for Margatham Chandrasekar for the Indian National Congress, in the Sriperumbudur constituency.

Voting and results

Results by Alliance

List of Elected MPs

c-indicates sitting/incumbent M.P. from previous Lok Sabha (1989–1991)

Post-election Union Council of Ministers from Tamil Nadu
Source: 
Even though Congress and AIADMK swept Tamil Nadu, which proved to be an important state for Narasimha Rao and Congress to have a minority government at the national level, no cabinet berths were given to members from Tamil Nadu. Also all 4 council of ministers were from the Congress party.

Ministers of State (Independent charge)

Ministers of State

See also 
Elections in Tamil Nadu

References

Other sources
Volume I, 1991 Indian general election, 10th Lok Sabha

External links
 Website of Election Commission of India
 CNN-IBN Lok Sabha Election History

1991 Indian general election
Indian general elections in Tamil Nadu
1990s in Tamil Nadu